Heydareh-ye Posht-e Shahr (also Romanized as  Ḩeydareh-ye Posht-e Shahr; also known as Ḩeydareh and Ḩeydar-e Posht-e Shahr) is a village in Alvandkuh-e Gharbi Rural District, in the Central District of Hamadan County, Hamadan Province, Iran. At the 2006 census, its population was 1,232, in 352 families.

References 

Populated places in Hamadan County